The Metro Manila Film Festival Award for Best Original Theme Song is an award presented annually by the Metropolitan Manila Development Authority (MMDA). It was first awarded at the 15th Metro Manila Film Festival ceremony, held in 1989; George Canseco won the award for his song composition in Imortal and it is given to a songwriters who have composed the best original song written specifically for a motion picture. Currently, nominees and winners are determined by Executive Committees, headed by the Metropolitan Manila Development Authority Chairman and key members of the film industry.

Winners and nominees

1980s

1990s

2000s

2010s

2020s

References

External links
IMDB: Metro Manila Film Festival
Official website of the Metro Manila Film Festival

Original Theme Song
Film awards for Best Song